Christianity is the main religion in Romania. Romania is a secular state, and it has no state religion. Romania is one of the most religious of European countries and the majority of the country's citizens are Orthodox Christians. 

The Romanian state officially recognizes 18 religions and denominations. 86.53% of the country's stable population identified as part of the Eastern Orthodox Church in the 2011 census (see also: History of Christianity in Romania). Other major Christian denominations include the Catholic Church (both Latin Catholicism (4.62%) and Greek Catholicism (0.8%–3.3%)), Calvinism (3.19%), and Pentecostal denominations (1.92%). This amounts to approximately 99% of the population identifying as Christian. Romania also has a small but historically significant Muslim minority, concentrated in Northern Dobruja, who are mostly of Crimean Tatar and Turkish ethnicity and number around 44,000 people. According to the 2011 census data, there are also approximately 3,500 Jews, around 21,000 atheists and about 19,000 people not identifying with any religion. The 2011 census numbers are based on a stable population of 20,121,641 people and exclude a portion of about 6% due to unavailable data.

Religious denominations

Eastern Orthodoxy 

The Eastern Orthodox Church is the largest religious denomination in Romania, numbering 16,307,004 according to the 2011 census, or 81.04% of the population. The rate of church attendance is, however, significantly lower. According to a poll conducted by INSCOP in July 2015, 37.8% of Romanians who declare themselves to be religious go to church only on major holidays, 25.4% once a week (especially on Sunday), 18.9% once a month, 10.2% once a year or less, 3.4% say they do not go to church, 2.7% a few times a week, and only 0.9% say they go to church daily.

Latin Church of the Catholic Church 

According to the 2011 census, there are 870,774 Catholics belonging to the Latin Church in Romania, making up 4.33% of the population. The largest ethnic groups are Hungarians (500,444, including Székelys; 41% of the Hungarians), Romanians (297,246 or 1.8%), Germans (21,324 or 59%), and Roma (20,821 or 3.3%), as well as a majority of the country's Slovaks, Bulgarians, Croats, Italians, Czechs, Poles, and Csangos (27,296 in all).

Romanian Greek Catholic Church 

According to the 2011 census, there are 150,593 Romanian Greek Catholics in Romania, making up 0.75% of the population. The majority of Greek Catholics live in the northern part of Transylvania. Most are Romanians (124,563), with the remainder mostly Hungarians or Roma.

On the other hand, according to data published in the 2012 Annuario Pontificio, the Romanian Greek Catholic Church had 663,807 members (3.3% of the total population), 8 bishops, 1,250 parishes, some 791 diocesan priests and 235 seminarians of its at the end of 2012. The dispute over the figure is included in the United States Department of State report on religious freedom in Romania. The Romanian Orthodox Church continues to claim many of the Romanian Greek Catholic Church's properties.

Protestantism 

According to the 2011 census, Protestants make up 6.2% of the total population. They have been historically been made up of Lutherans, Calvinists and Unitarians, although in recent years Evangelical Protestants, Pentecostals and newer Protestant groups spread and are holding a greater share. In 1930, prior to World War II, they constituted approximately 8.8% of the Romanian population. The largest denominations included in this figure (6.2%) are the Reformed (2.99%) and the Pentecostals (1.8%). Others also included are Baptists (0.56%), Seventh-day Adventists (0.4%), Unitarians (0.29%), Plymouth Brethren (0.16%) and three Lutheran churches (0.13%), the Evangelical Lutheran Church of Romania (0.1%), the Evangelical Church of Augustan Confession in Romania (0.03%) and The Confessional Lutheran Church in Romania (a Lutheran Church–Missouri Synod foreign mission). Of these various Protestant groups, Hungarians account for most of the Reformed, Unitarians, and Evangelical Lutherans; Romanians are the majority of the Pentecostals, Baptists, Seventh-day Adventists and Evangelical Christians; while Germans account for most of the Augustan Confession Evangelicals (i.e. Lutherans historically subscribing to the Augsburg Confession). The majority of Calvinist (Reformed Church) and Unitarians have their services in Hungarian.

Not to be confused with any of the above, the Evangelical Church of Romania (0.08%), is an indigenous Eastern Protestant denomination unrelated with the other protestant traditions.

Jehovah's Witnesses 

Jehovah's Witnesses were banned and persecuted in some occasions in Romania from 1948 to 1989. In 1989, after the Romanian ban was lifted, members and representatives of the Governing Body of Jehovah's Witnesses were able to gather thousands of Romanian Jehovah's Witnesses that had been separated for a long time, but some of them still rejected certain doctrinal changes and preferred their autonomy, forming The True Faith Association of Jehovah's Witnesses in 1992.

Nowadays, Romania is the only country in the world to have 2 different Jehovah's Witnesses organizations.

As for the main group, in 2020, the number of Jehovah's Witnesses was 39,328 active publishers, united in 535 congregations; 74,363 people attended annual celebration of Lord's Evening Meal in 2020.

The Church of Jesus Christ of Latter-day Saints

The Church of Jesus Christ of Latter-day Saints (LDS Church) had some presence in the country from 1899–1913. Most of these early members emigrated to the west. The LDS Church was reintroduced in 1990 and a small branch was formed in Bucharest in 1991. In 2019, the LDS Church claimed 3,064 members in 15 congregations in Romania.

Islam 

Although the number of adherents of Islam is relatively small, Islam enjoys a 700-year tradition in Romania particularly in Northern Dobruja, a region on the Black Sea coast which was part of the Ottoman Empire for almost five centuries (ca. 1420–1878). According to the 2011 census, 64,337 people, approx. 0.3% of the total population, indicated that their religion was Islam. The majority of the Romanian Muslims belong to the Sunni Islam.

97% of the Romanian Muslims are residents of the two counties forming Northern Dobruja: eighty-five percent live in Constanța County, and twelve percent in Tulcea County. The remaining Muslims live in cities like Bucharest, Brăila, Călărași, Galați, Giurgiu, Drobeta-Turnu Severin. Ethnically, most of them are Tatars, followed by Turks, Albanians, Muslim Roma, and immigrants from the Middle East and Africa, although there are a few ethnic Romanian converts to Islam who even established a mosque in 2014. Since 2007, there are Indonesian, Bangladeshi and Pakistani workers coming to Romania, who are mostly Muslims.

In Romania there are about 80 mosques. One of the largest is the Grand Mosque of Constanța, originally known as the Carol I Mosque. It was built between 1910 and 1913, on the order of Carol I, in appreciation for the Muslim community in Constanța. According to the legal status of the Muslim denomination, the Romanian Muslim community is officially represented by a mufti, while the Muftiat is the denominational and cultural representative institution of the Muslim community, with a status similar with that of the other denominations officially recognized by the Romanian state. Likewise, Muslims in Constanța, which comprise approx. 6% of the population of this county, are represented in the Parliament by the Democratic Union of Turkish-Muslim Tatars of Romania, founded on 29 December 1989.

Judaism

In 1930, more than 700,000 people in the Kingdom of Romania (including Bessarabia) practiced Judaism. By 2011, that number had dropped to 3,271. A legacy of the country's once numerous Jewish congregations is the large number of synagogues throughout Romania. Today, between 200,000 and 400,000 descendants of Romanian Jews are living in Israel.

Other religions 
Other denominations not listed above but recognised as official religions by the Romanian state are listed here. The Jehovah's Witnesses number around 50,000 adherents (0.25% of the stable population). Old Believers make up about 0.16% of the population with 30,000 adherents, who are mainly ethnic Russians living in the Danube Delta region. Serbian Orthodox believers are present in the areas which border Serbia and number about 14,000 people. Once fairly well represented in Romania, Judaism has fallen to around 3,500 adherents in 2011, which is about 0.02% of the population. Less still is the Armenian Christian minority, numbering about 400 people in total. The Association of Religion Data Archives reports roughly 1,900 followers of the Baháʼí Faith in the country as of 2010. Lastly, the number of people who have identified with other religions than the ones explicitly mentioned in the 2011 census comes to a total of about 30,000 people.

Paganism 

Neopagan groups have emerged in Romania over the latest decade, virtually all of them being ethno-pagan as in the other countries of European Union, although still small in comparison to other movements such as Ősmagyar Vallás in Hungary.

The revived ethnic religion of the Romanians is called Zalmoxianism and is based on 
Thracian mythological sources, with prominence given to the figure of god Zalmoxis. One of the most prominent Zalmoxian groups is the Gebeleizis Association.

In the same time, in Romania there is a recognized pagan organization: THE NEW PAGAN DAWN Association, which attempts to defend the rights of the pagan community in Romania and to represent its voice.

Irreligion 

Approximately 40,000 people have identified as nonreligious in Romania in the 2011 census, of which 21,000 declared atheists and 19,000 agnostics. Most of them are concentrated in major cities such as Bucharest or Cluj-Napoca. Irreligion is much lower in Romania than in most other European countries; one of the lowest in Europe.

Attitudes towards religion 
In 2008, 19% of Romanians placed "Faith" among maximum four answers to the question "Among the following values, which one is most important in relation to your idea of happiness?". It is the third highest number, after Armenia (27%), and Georgia (26%), at equality with Turkey (19%) and Cyprus (19%). The mean in EU-27 was 9%. According to a study by the Soros Foundation, over three quarters of Romanians consider themselves religious people, in a greater amount from rural areas, from women, from elders and from those with low income. Romanians believe in religious dogmas and the church, without absolutizing this belief, showing tolerance towards those who do not fully comply with scripture, towards other religions and even towards some scientific truths.

In 2011, 49% of Bucharesters declared that they only go to church on social occasions (weddings, Easter, etc.) or not at all. Only 26% told the same in the other parts of the country. According to preliminary data from the national 2011 census, 98.4% of the population declared themselves adherents of a religious denomination. This figure was contested, suggesting that the number of believers in disproportionately large. The final data for the 2011 national census shows a reduction of this figure to about 93.5% but includes a much larger portion of the population where religion-related data is missing (6.26%).

According to a survey conducted in July 2015, 96.5% of Romanians believe in God, 84.4% believe in saints, 69.6% believe in the existence of heaven, 57.5% in that of hell, and 54.4% in afterlife. 83% of Romanians say they observe Sundays and religious holidays, 74.6% worship when they pass by a church, 65.6% say they pray regularly, 60.2% state they sanctify their belongings, house, car, and 53.6% of Romanians donate regularly to the church.

Religious freedom 

The laws of Romania establish the freedom of religion as well as outlawing religious discrimination, and provide a registration framework for religious organizations to receive government recognition and funding (this is not a prerequisite for being able to practice in the country). The government also has programs for compensating religious organizations for property confiscated during World War II and during the rule of the Socialist Republic of Romania. Representatives of minority groups have complained that the government favors the Romanian Orthodox Church over other religious groups, and there have been several incidences of local government and police failing to enforce anti-discrimination laws reliably.

History 
During the existence of the Kingdom of Romania in the 19th and early 20th centuries, the government of Romania systematically favored the Orthodox and Romanian Greek Catholic Churches. Non-Christians were denied citizenship until the late 19th century, and even then faced obstacles and limited rights. Antisemitism was a prominent feature of Liberal political currents in the 19th century, before being abandoned by Liberal parties and adopted by left-wing peasant and later fascist groups in the early 20th century. During World War II, several hundred thousand Jews were killed by Romanian or German forces in Romania. Although Jews living in territories belonging to Romania prior to the beginning of the war largely avoided this fate, they nevertheless faced harsh antisemitic laws passed by the Antonescu government. During the Socialist era following World War II, the Romanian government exerted significant control over the Orthodox Church and closely monitored religious activity, as well as promoting atheism among the population. Dissident priests were censured, arrested, deported, and/or defrocked, but the Orthodox Church as a whole acquiesced to the government's demands and received support from it.

Historical evolution

Post 1989

Notes:

1 Census results were contested by the Romanian Greek Catholic Church which has a very different self-declared membership of: 2,011,635 (1995), 1,390,610 (2000), 707,452 (2010) and 504,280 (2016)

Historic Romania

Charts

See also 

Anti-religious campaign of Communist Romania
Religion by country
Religion in Europe

Notes

Bibliography 
 Lavinia Stan and Lucian Turcescu, Religion and Politics in Post-communist Romania, Oxford University Press, 2007. 
 Lavinia Stan and Lucian Turcescu, "Religion and Politics in Post-Communist Romania," in Quo Vadis Eastern Europe? Religion, State, Society and Inter-religious Dialogue after Communism, ed. by Ines A. Murzaku (Bologna, Italy: University of Bologna Press, 2009), pp. 221–235.
 Lavinia Stan and Lucian Turcescu, "Politics, National Symbols and the Romanian Orthodox Cathedral," Europe-Asia Studies, vol. 58, no. 7 (November 2006), pp. 1119–1139.
 Lavinia Stan and Lucian Turcescu, "Pulpits, Ballots and Party Cards: Religion and Elections in Romania," Religion, State and Society, vol. 33, no 4 (December 2005), pp. 347–366.
 Lavinia Stan and Lucian Turcescu, "The Devil's Confessors: Priests, Communists, Spies and Informers," East European Politics and Societies, vol. 19, no. 4 (November 2005), pp. 655–685.
 Lavinia Stan and Lucian Turcescu, "Religious Education in Romania," Communist and Post-Communist Studies, vol. 38, no. 3 (September 2005), pp. 381–401.
 Lavinia Stan and Lucian Turcescu, "Religion, Politics and Sexuality in Romania," Europe-Asia Studies, vol. 57, no. 2 (March 2005), pp. 291–310.
 Lavinia Stan and Lucian Turcescu, "The Romanian Orthodox Church and Post-Communist Democratization", Europe-Asia Studies, vol. 52, no. 8 (December 2000), pp. 1467–1488, republished in East European Perspectives, vol. 3, no. 4 (22 February 2001), available online at http://www.rferl.org/content/article/1342524.html, and vol. 3, no. 5 (7 March 2001), available online at http://www.rferl.org/content/article/1342525.html.
 

 
Dacian